Tubigon, officially the Municipality of Tubigon,  is a 1st class municipality in the province of Bohol, Philippines. According to the 2020 census, it has a population of 47,886 people.

Located  from Tagbilaran, it is the nearest seaport in Bohol to Cebu City, providing many daily ferry round-trips to Cebu City. It has recently expanded its seaport to accommodate additional sea traffic.

Tubigon is well known for its "lambay" crabs.

The municipality of Tubigon, Bohol celebrates its feast on May 15, to honor the town patron San Isidro Labrador.

History
The first settlers in Tubigon settled along the shores of the river that flows through the community. Their exact origins are unknown but they are thought to be early Malays from southeast Asian countries, migrating to the Philippines in small bangkas. Seasonal overflowing of the river flooded the community and led the place to be called "Tubigan" (meaning "place having water" or "watery"), which later morphed into "Tubigon" (meaning "place abounding in water"). The first record of the town of Tubigon dates from the early part of the 17th century.

In 1816, the community organized itself under a recognized headman, Yguiz Hutora, who was succeeded by teniente Mijares and by teniente Matong in 1818. A chapel was built on an elevated site of the settlement but had no officiating priest. A coadjutor of the Spanish friars from the Calape parish would perform the religious ceremonies.

In 1819, by authority of the Spanish Governor of Cebu, Tubigon was formally organized into an independent town by separating from the town of Calape, with Capitan Teniente Matong becoming the first gobernadorcillo.

Starting in 1852, the exact boundaries of the municipality were defined. On 8 March of that year, sitio Bacane was made the boundary between Tubigon and Inabanga. In 1856, the boundary with Calape was fixed at Mandaug. On 19 June 1865, the boundary between Tubigon and Catigbian was set at the Sampilangon River and on 14 September 1913, the boundary with Antequera (currently San Isidro) was fixed at sitio Tubod.

On 31 January 1919, Tubigon lost five barrios when Clarin was formed by virtue of proclamation by Governor Yeater.

Tubigon was badly affected by the 2013 Bohol earthquake, suffering 11 fatalities and damage to some 7,300 homes, as well as total destruction of its town hall and church.

Geography

Tubigon is bounded by Calape in the west, Clarin in the east, by the Cebu Strait in the north, and San Isidro in the south.

Barangays
Tubigon comprises 34 barangays:

Islands
There about 17 minor islands in the municipal, some of whom are inhabited:

 Bagongbanwa
 Batasan
 Bilangbilangan
 Budlaan
 Cabgan
 Cancostino
 Danajon Reef (part)
 Hayaan
 Inanuran
 Maagpit
 Mocaboc
 Pangapasan
 Sib
 Silo
 Taboan Islet
 Tangaon
 Ubay Island and Reef

Climate

Demographics

Economy 

Agriculture and fishing are the primary industries. 60% of the total land area of the municipality is used by agriculture and other related industries. The main agricultural produce includes rice, corn, coconut, bananas and different variety of vegetables.

Electric power is supplied by the Bohol Electric Cooperative I (BOHECO I). Its new administrative building is located in Tubigon along the National Road.

Transportation
Road
The main National Road is paved and provides easy access to neighboring coastal communities, with travel time to Tagbilaran about one hour. There are inland roads to Catigbian and San Isidro.

Public utility buses are available daily on routes to any point within the province of Bohol. Trips to Tagbilaran are on a 30-minute interval. Cars and vans are available for rent or charter any time.

Boat and ferry
Tubigon's municipal port is the second largest and busiest port in the province of Bohol. It is served by 6 conventional vessels and 2 modern fastcraft with a total of 20 trips daily to Cebu City. A roll-on/roll-off ferry operated by Lite Shipping Corporation is also operational making two trips daily.

There is no scheduled ferry service to smaller outlying islands, but outrigger canoes may be chartered any time.

Gallery

References

External links
 [ Philippine Standard Geographic Code]

Municipality of Tubigon
Tubigon

Municipalities of Bohol